Diuris palustris, commonly known as the swamp doubletail or swamp diuris is a species of orchid which is endemic to south-eastern Australia. It has a tuft of between eight and ten twisted leaves and up to four yellow flowers with brown spots and blotches marks and blotches.

Description
The flowers are yellow with dark brown spots and blotches. Flowering occurs from August to October.

Taxonomy and naming
Diuris palustris was first formally described in 1840 by John Lindley and the description was published in his book, The Genera and Species of Orchidaceous Plants. The specific epithet (palustris) is a Latin word meaning "marshy" or "boggy".

Distribution and habitat
The swamp doubletail is found in New South Wales, Victoria, Tasmania and South Australia where it is most common. It grows in moist or wet soil in forest, Callitris woodland and grassland.

Conservation
Diuris palustris is classed as "vulnerable" under the Victorian Flora and Fauna Guarantee Act 1988 and as "endangered" under the Tasmanian Threatened Species Protection Act 1995.

References

palustris
Orchids of South Australia
Orchids of Tasmania
Orchids of Victoria (Australia)
Endemic orchids of Australia
Plants described in 1840